Hastings is a town in the United Kingdom, most famous for the Battle of Hastings in 1066.

Hastings may also refer to:

Places

Australia
 Hastings, Tasmania, a locality
 Hastings, Victoria, Australia 
 Electoral district of Hastings, Victoria, Australia 
 Shire of Hastings, a former local government area before the Victoria's 1994 amalgamations
 Hastings River
 Port Macquarie-Hastings Council
 Hastings (Neutral Bay), a heritage listed building

Canada
 Hastings (electoral district), in Ontario
 Hastings, Annapolis County, Nova Scotia
 Hastings, Cumberland County, Nova Scotia
 Hastings, Ontario, a village
 Hastings County, Ontario
 Port Hastings, Nova Scotia
 Hastings Park, municipal park located in the northeast sector of Vancouver, British Columbia

United States
 Hastings, Florida, a town
 Hastings, Indiana, an unincorporated place
 Hastings, Iowa, a city
 Hastings, Michigan, a city
 Hastings Charter Township, Michigan
 Hastings, Minnesota, a city, county seat of Dakota County
 Hastings, Nebraska, a city, county seat of Adams County
 Hastings, New York, a town in Oswego County, New York 
 Hastings-on-Hudson, New York, a village in Westchester County, New York
 Hastings, Oklahoma, a town
 Hastings, Pennsylvania, a borough
 Hastings, North Dakota a town

Other
 Hastings, Christ Church, Barbados
 Hastings, Kolkata, neighbourhood in Kolkata, India
 Hastings, New Zealand
 Hastings District, New Zealand
 Hastings (New Zealand electorate), a former parliamentary electorate, 1946–1996
 Hastings, Sierra Leone
 Hastings, Somerset, a location in England
 Borough of Hastings, a district of East Sussex, containing the town of Hastings, England
 Hastings Borough Council
 Hastings Island, island in the southern part of the Mergui Archipelago, in Burma
 Hastingues, in the Gascony region of France, where the local Occitan language is Hastings

People
 Hastings (name), a surname and given name (and list of people with the name)
 Baron Hastings
 Marquess of Hastings

Education
 Alief Hastings High School, Houston, Texas
 Hastings College, a private, liberal arts college in Hastings, Nebraska
 University of California, Hastings College of the Law, San Francisco, California

Military
 Battle of Hastings
 Operation Hastings, an American military operation in the Vietnam War

Transport
 Hastings (East Indiaman), four ships that served the East India Company, including:
 
 
 Hastings (MBTA station), Weston, Massachusetts
 Handley Page Hastings, a British troop-carrier and freight transport aircraft
 Hastings line, a railway line in Kent and East Sussex, UK

Other uses
 Hastings and Rye (UK Parliament constituency)
 Hastings (horse)
 Hastings Entertainment, a defunct retailer
Hastings International Chess Congress, an annual chess tournament
The Hastings Center, Academy that addresses social and ethical issues in health care, science, and technology

See also
 Hastings Street (disambiguation)